Old Elizabethans may refer to:
The former name of the alumni of the Royal Grammar School Worcester. They are now called the Worcester "Alice Ottlians and Old Elizabethans".
Alumni of Elizabeth College, Guernsey, see :Category:People educated at Elizabeth College, Guernsey
Alumni of Queen Elizabeth's Hospital, Bristol, see :Category:People educated at Queen Elizabeth's Hospital, Bristol